is a Paralympian athlete from Japan competing mainly in category T52 long-distance events.

He competed in the 2008 Summer Paralympics in Beijing, China.  There he won a silver medal in the men's Marathon - T52 event, finished sixth in the men's 200 metres - T52 event, finished sixth in the men's 400 metres - T52 event and finished fourth in the men's 800 metres - T52 event

External links
 

Paralympic athletes of Japan
1971 births
Living people
Medalists at the 2008 Summer Paralympics
Medalists at the 2020 Summer Paralympics
Paralympic silver medalists for Japan
Paralympic bronze medalists for Japan
Paralympic medalists in athletics (track and field)
Athletes (track and field) at the 2008 Summer Paralympics
Athletes (track and field) at the 2020 Summer Paralympics
21st-century Japanese people
Medalists at the 2018 Asian Para Games
Japanese male wheelchair racers